Lampen is a surname. Notable people with the surname include:

John Lampen (born 1938), English Quaker and writer
Timo Lampén (1934–1999), Finnish basketball player